The 2008 Green National Convention took place on July 10–14, 2008 in Chicago, Illinois at the Palmer House Hilton and Symphony Center. This served as both the venue for the National Convention and the Annual Meeting of the Green Party of the United States.

Venues
The convention was headquartered at the historic Palmer House Hilton, while the nomination event itself  took place at the nearby Symphony Center on July 12.

Theme
The theme of the convention was, "Live Green, Vote Green".

Events

July 10
Main Events
Introductory news conference and a reception for international Greens.
Welcome Reception with International Greens
Evening Reception hosted by Rich Whitney

Additional Events
Credentialing Committee meeting
Accreditation Committee meeting
Diversity Caucus meeting
Platform Committee meeting
Lavender Caucus meeting
International Committee Meeting
Ballot Access Committee Meeting
National Women's Caucus
New York State Caucus
Bylaws, Rules, Policies & Procedures (BRPP) Committee Meeting
California State Caucus
Workshops:
GPUS Budget & Finances in General: Input, Q&A, and more (presented by Jody Grage and Jim Coplen)
Selling Yourself Without Selling Out (hosted by Scott McLarty)
A Clear Path Towards Dismantling and Ending All "ism" (Racism, sexism, classism and white privilege) within the Green Party by 2012 (facilitated by  Sedinam Kinamo Christin Moyowasifza-Curry)
Viral Campaign Marketing (presented by Jim Carr)
What Every Candidate Should Know (presented Brent McMillan)
What is Local Democracy? Building from the Bottom Up for Political Power (led by Juscha E. M. Robinson, Brenda Konkel, Pete Karas)

July 11
Main events
National Committee Meeting
News conferences for elected Greens, Green presidential candidates, and candidates for other offices 
Presidential Candidates Forum. moderated by Rich Whitney
Evening reception with John Nichols

Other Events
Morning Yoga
Eco-Action Committee meeting
Presidential Candidate Support Committee meeting
Outreach Committee meeting
Black Caucus meeting
Dispute Resolution Committee meeting
Disability Caucus meeting
Youth Caucus meeting
Maine State Caucus meeting
Latino Caucus meeting
Workshops
Fundraising 101 (featuring panelists LaVerne Butler, Angel Torres, George Martin, David Cobb, Jody Grange, Emily Citkowski, Tamar Yager)
The Role of Peace Movement in an Election Year (presented by Bruce Gagnon, Steve Shafarman and moderated by Ann Wilcox)
What is Central to the Green Message: Ecology? Democracy? Social Justice? (presented Gloria Mattera, Ben Manski and  John Rensenbrink, moderated by Mary Beth Sullivan)
Sustainable Activism (presented by Alison Duncan)
The 60th Anniversaries of the Palestinian Catastrophe (Nakba) and the UN Universal Declaration of Human Rights: Green Party's Response
The Constitutional MAP for Voter Disenfranchisement
Update on NAFTA and the North American Security and Prosperity Partnership (SPP)
The Law of Diminishing Returns as a Principle for Deciding How to Deal with the Need to Reduce Consumption to Restore the Environment
Organizing Online for Everyone
Campaign Fundraising
Candidate Messaging
Making Green Food Choices – How our diet affects animals and the environment
Democratizing the Electoral College
Endless War and the Military-Industrial- Governmental Complex
Red, Black, Brown and 'Green': Positive Solutions to the Issues of Poverty, Immigration and Environment Destruction
A Democracy Movement for the U.S.A.
The Basic Income Guarantee - and the Power of Green Economics

July 12
Main events
Platform vote
Keynote speeches by Cliff Thornton, Kathy Kelly, Malik Rahim, Jill Stein, Omar López
Speeches by Green Party presidential candidates
Presidential nomination vote
Vice presidential nomination and speech 
Presidential speech 
Press conference 
Post-convention reception at Palmer House

July 13
Main events
National Committee meeting with the new presidential nominee

Other events
Morning meditation led by Lewie Pell of the Network for Spiritual Progressives
Green Alliance Meeting
Workshops:
Agrarian Revival at the End of Cheap Oil
What to say when you're called a spoiler: instant runoff voting & proportional representation
LGBT Activism: Recent Victories and Future Goals
History of US-Iranian Relations and Its Impact on Current Tensions Regarding Iranian Nuclear Power
Strategic Thinking for Campaigns
Elections for Radicals

Speakers
Notable speakers included:
David Cobb activist and 2004 Green Party presidential nominee
Pat LaMarche, activist and 2004 Green Party vice presidential nominee
Rich Whitney, Green candidate for Governor of Illinois
John Nichols, journalist
Malik Rahim, activist, former Black Panther and Green Party candidate for Louisiana's 2nd congressional district
Kathy Kelly, activist
Cliff Thornton, Jr., activist and Green Party politician
Omar López, Green candidate for Illinois's 4th congressional district
Jill Stein, physician and Green candidate in the 2002 Massachusetts gubernatorial election
Brent McMillan
Sedinam Kinamo Christin Moyowasifza-Curry
Jim Carr
Ben Manski
John Rensenbrink

Presidential nomination
The presidential nomination took place July 12 at Chicago's Symphony Center.

Candidates

Balloting

Running mate

After McKinney's nomination, the convention delegates selected her stated choice of running mate, Rosa Clemente, for the vice-presidential nomination through a voice vote of delegates.

References
 Official Press Release

Video of Convention
 State Delegate voting part 1
 State Delegate voting part 2
 Cynthia McKinney Acceptance Speech
  Vote and Rosa Clemente Acceptance Speech
 David Cobb Convention Speech
 Malik Rahim Keynote Speech
 Omar López Keynote Speech
 Malik Rahim congressional candidate Louisiana
 Jesse Johnson addresses Convention Delegates

External links
 Official Convention Website
 Green Party 2008 Campaign Web Page
 Presidential Nomination Delegate Count

Green Party of the United States National Conventions
Green Party
Green National Convention
Political conventions in Chicago
Cynthia McKinney
2008 conferences
Green National Convention